Oppdal Station is a railway station located in downtown Oppdal in the municipality of Oppdal in Trøndelag county, Norway. It sits close to the European route E06 highway, just northwest of the mountain Allmannberget. The village of Oppdal is dominated by mountain tourism and skiing in winter.

The station is located along the Dovre Line, and it is served by four daily express trains going in each direction to Oslo and Trondheim. It is also served by a few daily Trøndelag Commuter Rail to Trondheim. The station was opened in 1921 as part of the Dovre Line when it was extended from Dombås to Trondheim.

Hotel

When building the Dovre Line, Norsk Spisevognselskap planned to build a tourist hotel at one of the stations. When the station opened on 20 September 1921, Norsk Spisevognselskap started operations of a station restaurant in the station building. The facilities were too small, but it would be too costly to expand the station building to make a larger restaurant. It was therefore decided to establish a combined restaurant and tourist hotel next to the station. Plans were made by architect Gudmund Hoel and district manager von Krogh and approved on 27 October 1922. The company purchased a  lot next to the station. The restaurant was taken into use on 22 June 1923 and the hotel opened on 28 June 1924. In the immediate vicinity, croquet and tennis fields were built as well as a bobsled and curling course. The hotel cost , of which the building itself cost .

The arrival both of the railway and the hotel was instrumental in the tourism boom which would follow in Oppdal. Opdal turisthotell was a key, as it had an external and professional owner which operated both restaurants and hotels elsewhere. In 1923, a longer dispute between the hotel and the municipality started regarding the liquor license. Initially the request was dismissed because of defamatory statement made by the police commissioner. Spisevognselskapet took the issue to the courts, who judicially declared the statement is null and void. An application was denied by the municipal council ahead of the opening of the hotel in 1924, and again the following year. Eventually in 1925, a license was granted by the municipal council. This was repeated until 1929, when the license was again dismissed. To avoid additional losses, Spisevognselskapet agreed with NSB to have a dining car put onto the train between Oppdal and Trondheim, and to close the hotel after Easter, from 5 April 1929, and remain closed during the low season. However, the Parliament of Norway intervened and instructed the state-owned company to keep the hotel open. It was therefore re-opened from 25 June 1929. Locals were not allowed to purchase alcoholic beverages at the hotels in Oppdal. Therefore, some locals would bicycle to the nearest station, get on the train and get off at Oppdal. There they would get into the same queues as the tourists and purchase the alcoholic beverages.

After the war, the hotel was renovated, including all-new interior and furniture for the restaurant and saloons. In 1952, a ski lift, largely owned by Spisevognselskapet, opened. In 1957, Architect Hugi Kohmann presented a model for three additions, two large two-story buildings and one eight-story. Although supported by the hotel management, the board of Spisevognselskapet were split, and in the end only one of the two-story extensions were built and completed in 1962. In 1973, Norsk Spisevognselskap sold the hotel. Another extension was launched in 1979, and completed in 1989. Ownership later passed to Johan Fr. Schønheyder.

References

Bibliography

Footnotes

Railway stations in Trøndelag
Railway stations on the Dovre Line
Railway stations opened in 1921
1921 establishments in Norway
Oppdal